SFOS may refer to:

 Sailfish OS, the Linux MeeGo Sailfish Operating System
 School of Fisheries and Ocean Sciences